Raymond Hecht (born 11 November 1968) is a German track and field athlete who competed in the javelin throw. His personal best throw is 92.60 m, achieved in 1995. This places him eighth on the all-time rankings.

During his career, Hecht set five German records. His best result in international competition was a bronze medal at the 1998 European Championships. At a club level, he represented SC Magdeburg in former East Germany.

In 2015, he won the M45 division of the World Masters Championships, representing France.

Seasonal bests by year
1986 - 71.08
1987 - 75.90
1990 - 83.24
1991 - 81.92
1992 - 79.58
1993 - 88.90
1994 - 90.06
1995 - 92.60
1996 - 92.28
1997 - 87.32
1998 - 88.08
1999 - 88.67
2000 - 87.76
2001 - 88.88
2002 - 87.87
2003 - 86.22
2004 - 82.85
2005 - 77.20
2006 - 73.94

International competitions

References

1968 births
Living people
People from Gardelegen
People from Bezirk Magdeburg
German male javelin throwers
East German male javelin throwers
Sportspeople from Saxony-Anhalt
Olympic athletes of Germany
World Athletics Championships athletes for Germany
Athletes (track and field) at the 1996 Summer Olympics
Athletes (track and field) at the 2000 Summer Olympics
European Athletics Championships medalists